A download manager is a software tool that manages the downloading of files from the Internet, which may be built: into a Web browser, or as a, usually more sophisticated program.

Data transmission